Jumeirah Zabeel Saray is a resort located on the west crescent of The Palm in Dubai, United Arab Emirates.

The Resort
The resort consists of the main hotel and residences, with a total of 405 rooms and numerous suites.

Popular culture
The Zabeel Saray was used during the Televised Reality Singing Series X Factor was partially filmed at the hotel with Nicole Scherzinger using it to choose which male contestants joined her in the live shows in 2012.

See also
Palm Jumeirah
Dubai World
List of hotels in Dubai

References

External links
Jumeirah Sabeel Saray, The Palm Official Site

Hotels in Dubai
Resorts in Dubai